Esther Dankwah (born June 25, 1982) is a Ghanaian sprinter who specializes in the 100 metres. She lives in the Netherlands since 2003.

She won the bronze medal with the African 4 x 100 metres relay team at the 2006 IAAF World Cup. With the Ghanaian 4 x 100 metres relay team she won a gold medal at the 2007 All-Africa Games and a silver medal at the 2008 African Championships.

Achievements

Personal bests
60 metres - 7.35 s (2006, indoor)
100 metres - 11.56 s (2005)
200 metres - 23.97 s (2007)

External links
 http://www.estherdankwah.nl

1982 births
Living people
Ghanaian female sprinters
World Athletics Championships athletes for Ghana
African Games gold medalists for Ghana
African Games medalists in athletics (track and field)
Athletes (track and field) at the 1999 All-Africa Games
Athletes (track and field) at the 2007 All-Africa Games
20th-century Ghanaian women
21st-century Ghanaian women